This article lists the sections or streets and roads with the steepest gradiants in the world.

 Ffordd Pen Llech in Harlech, Wales was previously thought to have the steepest city street in the world and was given the Guinness World Record with a gradient at 37.45%, however after an appeal made by Baldwin street residents, both streets were reassessed and the world's steepest Street was reinstated to Baldwin street, Dunedin.
 Baldwin Street in Dunedin, New Zealand, may be the steepest residential street in the world; it reportedly averages 1:3.41 (16.33° or 29.3%) for 161 meters but its maximum is claimed to be 35% for an unknown distance.
 Canton Avenue in Pittsburgh is said to have a 37% grade; the length of that grade is unknown.
  San Francisco, California is known for having numerous steep streets:
 The Filbert Steps section of Filbert Street has a maximum gradient of 31.5% (17.5°). The steepest hill on Filbert is the one-way down east half of the block between Hyde and Leavenworth.  The city map shows a descent of 65 feet, which based on a half-block being 206.25 horizontal feet makes the grade 31.5%, the official figure. 
 22nd Street shares the same 31.5% (17.5°) maximum gradient, between Vicksburg and Church Street., also one-way down. 
 The sidewalk-only section of Broderick Street (between Broadway and Vallejo), where the city map shows a climb of 96 feet in the 275-foot block) is steeper than Filbert in San Francisco, just under 35% grade
 The sidewalk-only block of Baker Street, just one block west of Broderick, also between Broadway and Vallejo is a bit steeper than Broderick. 
 An unofficial survey of San Francisco streets declared the steepest street in San Francisco to be a 30-foot section of Bradford Street, paved in 2010, with a 40% grade. 
 The curvy Lombard Street started as a 27% grade.
 Three streets in Los Angeles are steeper—28th Street in San Pedro at 33.3%, Eldred Street in Highland Park at 33%, and Baxter Street in Silver Lake at 32%.
Waipio Valley Road on the island of Hawai'i is said to be the steepest rural road in the United States, with some grades approaching 45%. It has been closed to non-local traffic.

References

Transport-related lists of superlatives
Lists of roads
Lists of streets